WBC CSKA Moscow was a Russian women's basketball team from Moscow. The club was competing in the Russian Premier League and FIBA Europe's Euroleague and was one of the most successful clubs of the country.

In 2009 CSKA was disbanded due to financial problems.

History
It represented sports society CSKA Moscow. CSKA was one of the most successful Soviet teams in the 1980s, winning two Ronchetti Cups and two Soviet Championships, and reaching the European Cup's final in 1990. Following the collapse of the Soviet Union the team dominated the new Russian Superleague for much of the 1990s, winning six championships between 1992 and 1997 and a third Ronchetti Cup. However, it declined in the late 1990s and was disbanded in 2001.

In 2006 CSKA Moscow reappeared in the women's basketball scene as 2005 Euroleague champions VBM-SGAU Samara relocated to Moscow and played under its name, crest and colours. However, the club wasn't able to win neither the Euroleague nor the national championship, with Spartak Moscow Region becoming the country's new leading force. CSKA subsequently fell into financial turmoil and was disbanded in October 2009.

Titles
  EuroLeague Women (1): 2005
  FIBA Women's World League (4): 2003, 2004, 2005, 2006–07
  Ronchetti Cup (3): 1985, 1989, 1997
  Soviet Championship (2): 1985, 1989
  Soviet Cup (1): 1978
  Russian Championship (9): 1992, 1993, 1994, 1995, 1996, 1997, 2004, 2005, 2006
  Russian Cup (4): 2004, 2005, 2007, 2008

Famous players
  Becky Hammon
  Ann Wauters
  Katie Douglas

References

CSKA
CSKA Moscow
Basketball teams established in 1924